Ćiro Truhelka (2 February 1865 – 18 September 1942) was a Croatian archeologist, historian and art historian who devoted much of his professional life to the study of the history of Bosnia and Herzegovina. He wrote about prehistoric, Roman and medieval findings, Turkish documents, Stećci, Roman and medieval money, and bosančica. He was also engaged in albanology. In addition, he was the first curator of the National Museum of Bosnia and Herzegovina.

Early life and education
Ćiro Truhelka was born on 2 February 1865 in Osijek to Antun Vjenceslav and Marija (née Schön) Truhelka. His father was of Czech and mother of German origin. He finished elementary school in Osijek after which he enrolled in high school that he eventually finished in Zagreb where he moved after his father's death along with his mother and siblings, Dragoš and Jagoda Truhelka. In youth, he showed interest in painting and technical sciences, but because of his family's poor financial situation, he opted for the study of philosophy at the University of Zagreb which lasted three years. He chose art history and history as main subjects. He received his doctorate in 1885 with the dissertation "Andrija Medulić: His Life and Work".

Professional career
As a student, Truhelka worked with Izidor Kršnjavi at the Strossmayer Gallery of Old Masters and made institutions' first catalog (1885). In 1886, he became secretary of the Museum Society for Bosnia and Herzegovina and the first curator of the National Museum of Bosnia and Herzegovina. His task was preparing Museum's opening in 1888. He was only 21 years old when he came to Sarajevo in which he lived for 40 years. In the  Museum, he managed the ethnographic, prehistoric, and medieval collections, but as there were not many experts, he cared for all museum collections except those from the field of natural sciences. As a curator, Truhelka arranged Bosnian pavilions at exhibitions in Budapest (1896), Brussels (1897) and Paris (1900). In 1905, he succeeded Kosta Hörmann as director of the National Museum and editor of the Gazette of the National Museum of Music (until 1920). Thanks to him, in 1913, the National Museum got a new building. He retired in 1922. In 1926, he got out of retirement as he was appointed a professor of archeology and art history at the University of Skopje, Macedonia. He eventually retired again in 1931. He served as the president of the Zagreb branch of the Society of Bosnian Croats.

Truhelka made an outstanding contribution to the study of the history of Bosnia and Herzegovina. Work at the Museum has influenced his diverse interest. He was engaged in the excavation of archaeological sites, Ilyrian graves and castles on prehistoric necropolises at Glasinac, a penitentiary settlement in Donja Dolina, a prehistoric cult edifice in Gorica near Posušje, and also dug up the early Christian basilica in Zenica and warned of the phenomenon of "Bosnian churches" and their early Christian background, explored the localities in the valley of Lašva river and around Stolac, the medieval Jajce and many other medieval cities. This brought him the recognition of anthropological congress in Vienna and membership in the Society. In the field of ethnology, he worked on an ethnographic collection and gave an overview of the national life in BiH. Truhelka made many important findings about pre-Ottoman Bosnia and Herzegovina, and gave a significant contribution to the research of the history of medieval Bosnia by the study of stećaks, material culture, bosančica, topography, numismatics, political, social and religious situation. In Prozor-Rama he verified the legend of Grabovac's Virgin (Diva Grabovčeva) when he recovered the remains of a young woman from the 16th or 17th century. In 1888, Truhelka excavated the remains of king Stjepan Tomašević, which are now housed in the Franciscan Monastery in Jajce. Truhelka studied the Albanian and Turkish languages for his researches.

In addition, his sister Jagoda Truhelka was a renowned Croatian writer.

Controversy
In order to provide anti-Yugoslavist Croat nationalism with a firm scientific basis, Truhelka used racial anthropology to differentiate between Croats and Serbs. Truhelka claimed that Bosnian Muslims were ethnic Croats, who, according to him, belonged predominantly to the Nordic-Dinaric racial type. On the other hand, the majority of Serbs belonged to the degenerate race of the Vlachs, similar to the Jews and Armenians, although Truhelka 'was cautious to distinguish between the dark-skinned Serbs of Vlach descent and the fair-haired Serbs who, according to him, were pure Slavs'.

At the time he was leading "Zemaljski muzej" in Sarajevo, some of scientific work and research were subordinate to the proving some of his pseudo-scientific views and attempts to find a confirmation of exaggerated assertions regarding the presence of Catholicism in Bosnia. On the other hand, in line with the politics of the Austro-Hungarian Empire, everything related to the Serbian heritage or Serbs was systematically avoided or suppressed.

Truhelka, like many others, enthusiastically welcomed the creation of the Independent State of Croatia in 1941. By his death a year later, he wrote some racist and pseudoscientific remarks towards Serbs in his book "Memoires of a Pioneer"; "Serbs are an ethnically-alien racial element that, according to their geopolitical position, belong to different cultural areas, and never had a common cultural history, faith nor cultural life, and that struggle being held in front of our eyes is the struggle of Vlah inhabitants against the indigenous Bosnian population, which has always been only Croatian." He claimed that Bosnian Muslims were ethnic Croats who belonged to the racially superior Nordic race. Miljenko Jergović wrote that the book, if this racist remark was put aside, was "one of the most powerful, literally superior, documentary precious Croatian books about Bosnia and Sarajevo at a time when this city turned from the fringes of the Turkish čaršija into one of the metropolises of the Habsburg Empire".

Works
 Starobosanski pismeni spomenici, 1894
 Starobosanski natpisi, 1895
 Slavonski banovci, 1897
 Osvrt na sredovječne kulturne spomenike Bosne, (1900.)
 Djevojački grob, (1901.)
 Državno i sudbeno ustrojstvo Bosne u doba prije Turaka, 1901
 Kraljevski grad Jajce, 1904
 Naši gradovi, 1904
 Arnautske priče, 1905
 Hrvarska Bosna: Mi i "oni tamo" (Croatian Bosnia: We and "They over There"), 1907
 Crtice iz srednjeg vijeka, 1908
 Dubrovačke vijesti o godini 1463., 1910
 Tursko-slavjenski spomenici dubrovačke arhive, 1911
 Gazi Husrefbeg, 1912
 Kulturne prilike Bosne i Hercegovine u doba prehistoričko, 1914
 Historička podloga agrarnog pitanja u Bosni, 1915
 Das Testament des Gost Radin, 1916
 Stari turski agrarni zakonik za Bosnu, 1917
 Konavoski rat 1430.-1433., 1917
 Nekoliko misli o rješenju bosanskog agrarnog pitanja, 1918
 Sojenica kao ishodište pontifikata, 1930
 Starokršćanska arheologija, 1931
 O porijeklu bosanskih muslimana, 1934
 Studije o podrijetlu. Etnološka razmatranja iz Bosne i Hercegovine, 1941
 Uspomene jednog pionira, Croatian Publishing and Bibliographic Institute, 1942

References

1865 births
1942 deaths
People from Osijek
Anti-Serbian sentiment
Croatian archaeologists
20th-century Croatian historians
Croatian art historians
Burials at Mirogoj Cemetery
Historians of Bosnia and Herzegovina
Bosnia and Herzegovina art historians
Croatian people of Czech descent
Croatian people of German descent
19th-century Croatian historians